Theodor Roos (1638–1698) was a German Baroque painter of historical scenes.

Biography
He was born in Wesel. His family left their home in the Palatinate c. 1637, fleeing the Thirty Years War, and moved to Amsterdam around 1640. There, from 1647 to 1651, Roos trained alongside his brother Johann Heinrich Roos in history painting with Guilliam Dujardin (1597–after 1647), in landscape with Cornelis de Bie and in portraiture with Barent Graat.

The brothers returned with the rest of the family to Germany in 1653, where they worked for a monastery in Mainz.  When Johann left, Theodor Roos won a commission  to paint the civic guard in Mannheim.  The painting was displayed in the city hall, and won him the favor of Charles I Louis, Elector Palatine, whose wedding portraits he painted in return for a golden necklace with a commemorative coin. Thereafter he painted in Strassbourg, Hof van Velde, van Birkenfelt, Bade, Hanau, and Hof van Wirtenburg. In Strassbourg he was granted amnesty when the city was taken by the French, because of his long history of painting military heroes.

Family tree

References

Theodor Roos in the RKD
Theodor Roos on artnet

1638 births
1698 deaths
17th-century German painters
German male painters
German Baroque painters
Dutch Golden Age painters
Dutch male painters
People from Wesel